Ava Ranger Station Historic District is a national historic district located near Ava, Douglas County, Missouri. The district encompasses five frame and limestone buildings constructed by Civilian Conservation Corps in 1936. They are the 1 1/2-story, Colonial Revival style Ranger's Office; 1 1/2-story, Colonial Revival style Ranger's Dwelling; garage; warehouse and an oil house.  It continues to be used as a Ranger Station for the Mark Twain National Forest.

It was listed on the National Register of Historic Places in 2003.

References

External links
Mark Twain National Forest

Civilian Conservation Corps in Missouri
Historic districts on the National Register of Historic Places in Missouri
Colonial Revival architecture in Missouri
Buildings and structures completed in 1936
Buildings and structures in Douglas County, Missouri
National Register of Historic Places in Douglas County, Missouri